Carpelimus aridus is a species in the subfamily Oxytelinae ("spiny-legged rove beetles"), in the suborder Polyphaga ("water, rove, scarab, long-horned, leaf and snout beetles").
It is found in the Caribbean.

References

Further reading
 Arnett, R.H. Jr., M. C. Thomas, P. E. Skelley and J. H. Frank. (eds.). (2002). American Beetles, Volume II: Polyphaga: Scarabaeoidea through Curculionoidea. CRC Press LLC, Boca Raton, FL.
 Arnett, Ross H. (2000). American Insects: A Handbook of the Insects of America North of Mexico. CRC Press.
 Herman, Lee H. (2001). "Catalog of the Staphylinidae (Insecta: Coleoptera). 1758 to the end of the second millenium. III. Oxyteline group". Bulletin of the American Museum of Natural History, no. 265, 1067–1806.
 Richard E. White. (1983). Peterson Field Guides: Beetles. Houghton Mifflin Company.

Oxytelinae
Beetles described in 1857